Closed-loop communication is a communication technique used to avoid misunderstandings. 

When the sender gives a message, the receiver repeats this back. The sender then confirms the message; thereby common is using the word “yes”. When the receiver incorrectly repeats the message back, the sender will say “negative” (or something similar) and then repeat the correct message. If the sender, the person giving the message, does not get a reply back, he must repeat it until the receiver starts closing the loop. To get the attention of the receiver, the sender can use the receiver's name or functional position, touch his or her shoulder, etc.

References

Communication studies
Social groups
Teams
Risk management
Human communication